The Church of St John the Baptist in Axbridge, Somerset, England, was built in the 13th century and has been designated as a grade I listed building.

Work on the current building began in the early 15th century, and grew from an earlier building dating back to about 1230. The church is built of limestone and decorated with Doulting stone, while the steps are an interesting example of dolomitic conglomerate, which is called puddingstone.

The statue on the east side is that of St John the Baptist. On the west side is a king — perhaps Henry VII, which would place it after 1485. The North aisle ceiling retains some mediaeval painted panels, and amongst the carved bosses is the head of a Green Man, with leaves sprouting around his face. The nave roof is Jacobean and dates from 1636. The church was restored by John Dando Sedding in the 1880s.

The churchyard contains a Commonwealth war grave of a Dorsetshire Regiment soldier of World War II.

See also

 List of Grade I listed buildings in Sedgemoor
 List of towers in Somerset
 List of ecclesiastical parishes in the Diocese of Bath and Wells

References

13th-century church buildings in England
Church of England church buildings in Sedgemoor
Grade I listed churches in Somerset
Grade I listed buildings in Sedgemoor
Axbridge